The Panama women's national football team represents Panama in international women's football. The team is overseen by the Federación Panameña de Fútbol. Panama has made four appearances at the CONCACAF Women's Championship, with their best result being the semi-final finish in 2018. In 2023, Panama will make their debut in the FIFA Women's World Cup.

History

2000s
In 2002 Panama qualified for the CONCACAF Women's Gold Cup for the first time after securing one of two spots in Central American Zone qualifying. They went 1–0–2 at the 2002 CONCACAF Women's Gold Cup and did not qualify for the knockout round.

Panama once again qualified for the Women's Gold Cup in 2006 after winning their qualifying group. Panama lost their first-round match 2–1 to Jamaica and were eliminated.

2010s
Panama did not participate in the 2010 CONCACAF Women's World Cup Qualifying tournament as they did not enter Central American qualifying.

In 2013 Panama participated in the Central American Games for the first time. They went 1–0–1 and advanced to the semi-finals, where they lost to Costa Rica. Panama would finish in fourth place after losing the third place match to Guatemala.

Panama finished second in their group in 2014 Central American Qualifying and did not qualify for the 2014 CONCACAF Women's Championship as only the group winner advanced.

At the 2017 Central American Games, Panama improved on their result from four ago by defeating El Salvador on penalties to finish in third place.

Panama secured one of the two spots available in Central American Qualifying for the 2018 CONCACAF Women's Championship, this marked their first time playing in the CONCACAF Championship in 12 years. Panama was drawn into Group A, alongside the United States, Mexico and Trinidad and Tobago.

Panama opened the 2018 CONCACAF Women's Championship with a 3–0 victory over Trinidad and Tobago. They suffered a 5–0 loss to the United States in their second match. The score could have been much worse if not for the excellent performance from 17-year old goalkeeper Yenith Bailey, as she made several big saves against the US who had 18 shots on goal. Panama secured their spot in the semi-final by defeating Mexico 2–0 in their final group match. Bailey once again made some big saves, including saving a penalty in the first half. Panama was beat by Canada 7–0 in the semi-final, but they would move on to the third place match where a win would secure them a spot in the 2019 FIFA Women's World Cup. After losing the third place match to Jamaica on penalties, Panama played against Argentina at the CONCACAF-CONMEBOL play-off to secure a spot for France 2019 but was eliminated from the qualification after losing 1–5 to the Argentines on aggregate.

2020s
Panama qualified for the 2022 CONCACAF W Championship and took part in the group stage, against its arch-rival and neighbour Costa Rica, alongside regional powerhouse Canada and Trinidad and Tobago. Panama suffered two defeats to Costa Rica and Canada, thus lost the chance to finish in top two, but by winning 1–0 over Trinidad and Tobago in the decisive third place match, Panama was able to qualify for the inter-confederation play-offs for the 2023 FIFA Women's World Cup, where the quest for its potential World Cup debut continues.

Team image

Nicknames
The Panama women's national football team have been nicknamed as "Las Canaleras (The Canal Girls)".

Home stadium
Panama plays their home matches on the Estadio Rommel Fernández.

Results and fixtures

The following is a list of match results in the last 12 months, as well as any future matches that have been scheduled.

Legend

2022

2023

Panama Fixtures and Results – Soccerway.com

Coaching staff

Current coaching staff

Technical Corps

Medical staff

Administrative

Manager history

 Ignacio Quintana (2020–)

Players

Current squad
The following players were called-up for the matches against Papua New Guinea and Paraguay on 19 and 23 February 2023.

Recent call-ups
The following players were called-up in the last 12 months.
This list may be incomplete.

Records

Players in bold are still active, at least at club level.

Most capped players

Top goalscorers

Competitive record

FIFA Women's World Cup

*Draws include knockout matches decided on penalty kicks.

Olympic Games

*Draws include knockout matches decided on penalty kicks.

CONCACAF Women's Championship

*Draws include knockout matches decided on penalty kicks.

Pan American Games

*Draws include knockout matches decided on penalty kicks.

Central American and Caribbean Games

*Draws include knockout matches decided on penalty kicks.

Central American Games

*Draws include knockout matches decided on penalty kicks.

See also

Sport in Panama
Football in Panama
Women's football in Panama
Panama women's national under-20 football team
Panama women's national under-17 football team
Panama men's national football team

References

External links
Official website 
FIFA profile

 
Central American women's national association football teams
Women's sport in Panama